Lars Iyer is a British novelist and philosopher of Indian/Danish parentage. He is best known for a trilogy of short novels: Spurious (2011), Dogma (2012), and Exodus (2013), all published by Melville House. Iyer has been shortlisted for both the Believer Book Award (Spurious, 2011) and the Goldsmiths Prize (Exodus, 2013). He has also written and published two books about Maurice Blanchot.

Iyer is a lecturer at Newcastle University.

Iyer has published, in The White Review, "a literary manifesto after the end of Literature and Manifestos".

Works
Fiction
Spurious (2011, Melville House)
Dogma (2012, Melville House)
Exodus (2013, Melville House)
Wittgenstein Jr (2014, Melville House)
Nietzsche and the Burbs (2019, Melville House)

Non-Fiction
Blanchot's Communism (2004, Palgrave Macmillan)
Blanchot's Vigilance: Literature, Phenomenology and the Ethical (2004, Palgrave Macmillan)

References

External links

Personal Blog

Living people
21st-century English novelists
1970 births
English male novelists
21st-century English male writers
Academics of Newcastle University